Muchedent is a commune in the Seine-Maritime department in the Normandy region in north-western France.

Geography

Population

Places of interest
 The bison farm.
 The church of St. Pierre, dating from the eleventh century.
 A nineteenth century château.

See also
Communes of the Seine-Maritime department

References

External links

 Website of the bison farm 

Communes of Seine-Maritime